The 2012 World Outdoor Bowls Championship men's pairs  was held at the Lockleys Bowling Club in Adelaide, Australia. Some of the qualifying Rounds were held at the nearby Holdfast Bowling Club in Glenelg North.

Alex Marshall and Paul Foster won the men's pairs Gold.

Section tables

Pool 1

Pool 2

Finals

Results

References

Men